James Ross Meskimen (born September 10, 1959) is an American actor, comedian and impressionist, who is best known for his voice-over work in video games.

Early life
James Ross Meskimen was born in Santa Monica, California on September 10, 1959, the son of Marion Ross and Freeman Meskimen.

Career
In the 1990s, Meskimen played 5 inch tall "Little Guy" in commercials for TGIFridays.

In the 2000s, Meskimen portrayed the father of Mary-Kate Olsen and Ashley Olsen's characters in Our Lips Are Sealed, and Officer Wholihan in How the Grinch Stole Christmas.

For voiceover, he provided the voices of Thom Cat, Neighbor John, and Stumpy in the Thom Cat short film on Random! Cartoons, Genie in the Aladdin franchise (which started with Disney Think Fast in 2008 and even before Robin Williams's death in 2014), several different characters in Lego The Lord of the Rings, George W. Bush and other politicians for the Jib Jab animated shorts, David Petraeus in Call of Duty: Black Ops 2 (which he also motion-captured), and Ultron (as well as other characters) in various Marvel projects.

Meskimen was a contestant on season eight of America's Got Talent. He has also toured various U.S. cities performing a one-man act, entitled "Jimpressions", of celebrity impersonations and original characters.

Personal life
In 1987, Meskimen married Tamra Shockley. They have a daughter named Taylor (born 1990). He is also a Scientologist.

Filmography

Film

Television

3rd Rock from the Sun – Alan (Season 2 Episode 4)
Anger Management – Daniel
 Avatar: The Last Airbender – Lieutenant Jee, General How, Avatar Kuruk
 Brooklyn Nine-Nine – Deputy Chief Williams (Season 8 Episodes 9 and 10)
 Community – Christopher Walken/Tommy Lee Jones impersonator (Season 3 Episode 11)
 Friends – Bill (Season 10 Episode 2)
 Even Stevens - Dr. Dean
 Good Omens - George H. W. Bush (voice)
 Hot in Cleveland – Professor Zucker 
 Kickin' It - Principal Bucket (Season 2, Episode 9) 
 Mad – Gandalf, Droopy, Benedict Arnold, additional voices
 Malcolm in the Middle  – Waiter
 NCIS - Dr. Farrel Emerson
 Parks and Recreation – Martin Housely
 Phineas and Ferb – Additional voices
 Random! Cartoons – Thom Cat, Neighbor John, Stumpy ("Thom Cat" short)
 Rules of Engagement – Mr. Wrigley
 Shaggy & Scooby-Doo Get a Clue! – Agent 1, Robi
 Superman: Red Son – Lex Luthor, Perry White, Guy Gardner / Green Lantern, Joseph Stalin, Jor-El
 The Big Bang Theory – Doctor, Man (voice), Las Vegas Wedding Chapel Minister
 The Boondocks – Bill O'Reilly, Chris Hansen, Additional voices
 The Fresh Prince of Bel-Air – Prof. Jeremy Mansfield (Season 4 Episode 3), Werner (Season 6 Episodes 2 and 3 and 11)
 The Real Adventures of Jonny Quest – Additional voices
 Time Squad – George W. Bush, George H.W. Bush
 Two and a Half Men – Gangster #2 (voice)
 Whose Line Is it Anyway? – Himself

Video games
 Armored Core V - Jack Batty, Men of Honor Unit B, Zodiac No. 8
 Baldur's Gate – Edwin Odesseiron, Jebadoh, Khalid, Thaldorn
 Baldur's Gate II: Shadows of Amn – Edwin Odesseiron
 Baldur's Gate II: Throne of Bhaal – Edwin Odesseiron, Khalid
 Batman: Arkham City – Officer Tom Miller
 Batman: Arkham Knight – Additional voices
 Batman: Arkham Origins – SWAT Officers, Cops
 Call of Duty: Black Ops – John F. Kennedy
 Call of Duty: Black Ops 2 – Secretary of Defense David Petraeus
 Command & Conquer 4: Tiberian Twilight – Various
 Destroy All Humans! 2 - Additional voices
 Diablo III – Additional voices
 Diablo III: Reaper of Souls – Additional voices
 Disney Infinity 3.0 – Ultron 
 Disney Think Fast – Genie
 Epic Mickey – Voice
 Epic Mickey 2: The Power of Two – Mad Doctor
 EverQuest II – Guild Patron Volarian, Baron Zafimus, Sergeant-at-Arms Ironcast, Commission Deputy Halford, Naturalist Tummyfill, Borthen, Amren Talbot, Morte Winghammer, Green Hood Trap Master, Banker Izark, Ubani, Overseer Travog
 Fantastic 4 – Doctor Doom, Additional voices
 Final Fantasy XIII-2 – Additional voices
 Gothic 3 - Additional voices
 Hitman: Blood Money – Additional voices
 Kinect Disneyland Adventures – Genie
 Kingdom Hearts HD 2.5 Remix – Genie (Kingdom Hearts Re:coded cinematics)
 Lego Jurassic World – Additional voices
 Lego The Lord of the Rings – Various
 Lightning Returns: Final Fantasy XIII – Additional voices
 Madagascar: The Video Game – Albino Crocodile, Guard, Jogger, Sailor
 Marvel Dimension of Heroes - Ultron
 Marvel vs. Capcom: Infinite - Ultron, Ultron Sigma, Ultron Omega
 Marvel Ultimate Alliance 3: The Black Order - Ultron, Ultimo
 MAG - SVER Executive
 Minecraft Story Mode - Milo
 Nickelodeon All-Star Brawl - Nigel Thornberry (voiceover added in the June 2022 update)
 Robots - Ratchet, Additional voices
 Shark Tale: The Video Game – Lino, Additional Tenant Fish
 Shrek the Third - Captain Hook, Attendant 2, Geek
 Skylanders: Trap Team – Additional voices
 Sorcerers of the Magic Kingdom - Genie
 Syndicate - Additional voices
 Teenage Mutant Ninja Turtles: Mutants in Manhattan - Wingnut, Stone Warriors
 The Lego Movie Videogame – Additional voices
 The Lord of the Rings: The Battle for Middle-earth II – Elven King Thranduil
 The Lord of the Rings: The Battle for Middle-earth II - The Rise of the Witch-king - King Thranduil
 Ultimate Spider-Man – Additional voices

Internet
 Jib Jab – George W. Bush

Music
 Bugs Bunny and Friends Sing The Beatles – Elmer Fudd

References

External links

 
 

1959 births
Living people
America's Got Talent contestants
American impressionists (entertainers)
American male comedians
American male film actors
American male television actors
American male video game actors
American male voice actors
American Scientologists
Comedians from California
Male actors from Los Angeles
20th-century American male actors
21st-century American male actors